Teteté may refer to:
the Teteté people of the Acuadorian Amazon
the Teteté language, a Tucanoan language

Language and nationality disambiguation pages